Wahlville is an unincorporated community located in southwestern Butler County, Pennsylvania, United States, with the total population of around 25 people. It is in the northwestern corner of Forward Township. It had two coal mines and three bridges to enter it.

Notes

Unincorporated communities in Butler County, Pennsylvania
Unincorporated communities in Pennsylvania